Xavier Llobet Sallent (born May 16, 1974  in Manresa, Catalonia) is a Spanish triathlete.

Llobet competed in the second Olympic triathlon at the 2004 Summer Olympics.  He did not finish the competition. His runs for Club Triatló Manresa

References

1974 births
Living people
Sportspeople from Manresa
Athletes from Catalonia
Spanish male triathletes
Triathletes at the 2004 Summer Olympics
Olympic triathletes of Spain